Charles Edward Smith (born October 21, 1969) is a former Major League Baseball player and a former mayor of Woodmere, Ohio. He attended John Adams High School in Cleveland, Ohio and later Indiana State University. He was listed at 6 ft 1 in, 185 pounds during his playing days and growing up his idol was Satchel Paige.

Career
He was originally drafted in the 30th round (772nd overall) in the 1989 draft by the Montreal Expos. He did not sign, but in  the Houston Astros picked him up as an undrafted free agent.

Smith spent time in all levels of pro ball (including independent baseball and international baseball) as both a starter and reliever. He also struck out 145 batters in 167 innings pitched that year.

His major league debut (June 30) was impressive-in six innings of work, he gave up six hits, struck out six and only allowed one earned run-a home run by Ron Gant in the first inning, which was also the first hit he ever gave up. He earned no decision in the game. He won his first game on July 27 of that year against the Atlanta Braves-in five innings of work, he walked four, struck out two, and gave up six hits but still managed a win. He completed his first game on September 23 against the Colorado Rockies-albeit a shortened game. He finished his rookie season with a 6–6 record and a 3.23 ERA. Smith received a single vote in National League Rookie of the Year voting, tying him for sixth place with Lance Berkman and Juan Pierre.

Described as being "...on top of his game when he moves his pitches around...with his incredible control", Smith "...smokes his fastball past hitters up high and induces pathetic ground balls with his low off-speed stuff." He apparently lost some of that skill in 2001 as went 5–5 with an ERA that jumped to 4.70 while he also gave up the 16th home run in Barry Bonds record breaking 2001 season, when Bonds hit 73 homers. He played his final major league game on July 24, 2001. During his two seasons in the major leagues, he earned $175,000 in 2000 and $240,000 in 2001, respectively.

In 2004, Smith pitched for the Richmond Braves and was tied with Alex Graman in leading the International League in strikeouts with 129.

Smith pitched for the Brother Elephants in the Chinese Professional Baseball League in 2006.

Career stats
Overall, he went 11–11 with a 3.84 ERA in his major league career in 34 games started. He struck out 189 batters in 210+ innings. He gave up just 16 home runs in his career. He had a .136 average as a batter. He walked once and struck out 27 times in 66 at bats. As a fielder, he made three errors for a .935 fielding percentage.

After his time with the Marlins, he jumped around the minor leagues in the Rockies, Mets, Braves and Orioles farm systems. He finished his minor league career with an 89–76 record, and an ERA of 3.89 and his career in the minors compared statistically to John Miller.

Post-playing career
In February 2008, Smith was named pitching coach of the Lancaster JetHawks, a minor league affiliate of the Boston Red Sox.

In November 2009, Smith was elected mayor of Woodmere, Ohio, a position he held for two terms.

On May 19, 2022, Smith pleaded guilty in the United States District Court for the Northern District of Ohio to one count each of access device fraud and aggravated identity theft stemming from his purchasing stolen debit card and credit card information on the dark web and using it to put gas in the truck which he used to deliver packages for Amazon. Senior Judge Christopher A. Boyko sentenced him to 33 months in prison on August 25, 2022.

References

External links
, or Retrosheet, or Korea Baseball Organization, or Pura Pelota (VPBL)

1969 births
Living people
African-American baseball players
Algodoneros de Unión Laguna players
American expatriate baseball players in Canada
American expatriate baseball players in Mexico
American expatriate baseball players in South Korea
American expatriate baseball players in Taiwan
Asheville Tourists players
Baseball players from Memphis, Tennessee
Birmingham Barons players
Brevard County Manatees players
Brother Elephants players
Calgary Cannons players
Colorado Springs Sky Sox players
Doosan Bears players
Florida Marlins players
Greenville Braves players
Gulf Coast Astros players
Indiana State Sycamores baseball players
Indiana State University alumni
Jackson Generals (Texas League) players
KBO League pitchers
Leones del Caracas players
Major League Baseball pitchers
Mayors of places in Ohio
Mexican League baseball pitchers
Nashville Sounds players
Navegantes del Magallanes players
American expatriate baseball players in Venezuela
Oklahoma RedHawks players
Osceola Astros players
Ottawa Lynx players
People from Cuyahoga County, Ohio
Prince William Cannons players
Quad Cities River Bandits players
Richmond Braves players
Sioux Falls Canaries players
South Bend Silver Hawks players
John Adams High School (Ohio) alumni
21st-century African-American people
20th-century African-American sportspeople
American sportspeople convicted of crimes
American politicians convicted of fraud
Ohio politicians convicted of crimes